History of the Congo can refer to: 

History of the Republic of the Congo
History of the Democratic Republic of the Congo